Alex Thompson (8 December 1917 – August 2002) was an English footballer, who played as a full back in the Football League for Tranmere Rovers.

References

External links

Tranmere Rovers F.C. players
Lincoln City F.C. players
Boston United F.C. players
Association football fullbacks
English Football League players
Sheffield Wednesday F.C. players
1917 births
2002 deaths
Footballers from Sheffield
English footballers